The men's team épée was one of seven fencing events on the fencing at the 1952 Summer Olympics programme. It was the ninth appearance of the event. The competition was held from 25 July 1952, to 26 July 1952. 98 fencers from 19 nations competed.

Results
Source: Official results; and Sports Reference

Round 1

The top two nations in each pool advanced to the quarter finals.

Quarter-finals

The top two nations in each pool advanced to the semi-finals.

Semifinals

The top two nations in each pool advanced to the final.

Final

The final was a round-robin.

Results

 8-5  
 12-4 
 12-2 
 8-6  
 13-3 
 8-4

Rosters

Australia
 Jock Gibson
 Charles Stanmore
 John Fethers
 Ivan Lund

Belgium
 Ghislain Delaunois
 Jean-Baptiste Maquet
 Albert Bernard
 Robert Henrion
 Paul Valcke

Brazil
 Darío Amaral
 César Pekelman
 Walter de Paula
 Helio Vieira

Denmark
 Raimondo Carnera
 Erik Swane Lund
 René Dybkær
 Mogens Lüchow
 Ib Nielsen
 Jakob Lyng

Egypt
 Osman Abdel Hafeez
 Salah Dessouki
 Mahmoud Younes
 Mohamed Abdel Rahman

Finland
 Kauko Jalkanen
 Erkki Kerttula
 Rolf Wiik
 Nils Sjöblom
 Jaakko Vuorinen
 Paavo Miettinen

France
 Jean-Pierre Muller
 Armand Mouyal
 Daniel Dagallier
 René Bougnol
 Gérard Rousset
 Claude Nigon

Great Britain
 René Paul
 Allan Jay
 Christopher Grose-Hodge
 Ronald Parfitt
 Raymond Harrison
 Charles de Beaumont

Hungary
 Lajos Balthazár
 Barnabás Berzsenyi
 Béla Rerrich
 József Sákovics
 Imre Hennyei

Italy
 Edoardo Mangiarotti
 Dario Mangiarotti
 Giuseppe Delfino
 Carlo Pavesi
 Franco Bertinetti
 Roberto Battaglia

Luxembourg
 Émile Gretsch
 Jean-Fernand Leischen
 Paul Anen
 Léon Buck

Norway
 Egill Knutzen
 Alfred Eriksen
 Johan von Koss
 Sverre Gillebo

Poland
 Andrzej Przeździecki
 Wojciech Rydz
 Jan Nawrocki
 Adam Krajewski
 Zygmunt Grodner

Portugal
 Álvaro Pinto
 Carlos Dias
 Álvaro Mário Mourão
 Francisco Uva
 João Costa

Soviet Union
 Genrikh Bulgakov
 Juozas Ūdras
 Lev Saychuk
 Yury Deksbakh
 Ak'ak'i Meipariani

Sweden
 Per Carleson
 Carl Forssell
 Bengt Ljungquist
 Berndt-Otto Rehbinder
 Sven Fahlman
 Lennart Magnusson

Switzerland
 Otto Rüfenacht
 Paul Meister
 Oswald Zappelli
 Paul Barth
 Willy Fitting
 Mario Valota

United States
 Edward Vebell
 Paul Makler Sr.
 Alfred Skrobisch
 Joe de Capriles
 James Strauch
 Albert Wolff

Venezuela
 Gustavo Gutiérrez
 Giovanni Bertorelli
 Olaf Sandner
 Juan Camous

References

Fencing at the 1952 Summer Olympics
Men's events at the 1952 Summer Olympics